Arsen Ibragimovich Siukayev (born 7 March 1996) is a Russian football player. He plays for Spartak Nalchik.

Career

Club
Siukayev made his professional debut in the Russian Professional Football League for FC Kaluga on 4 November 2014 in a game against FC Ryazan.

On 11 January 2019, Siukayev signed for Lori FC.

Siukayev played in the 2019–20 Russian Cup campaign for FC Tom Tomsk as they eliminated Russian Premier League club FC Tambov with a score of 4–0, before falling to Russian champions FC Zenit Saint Petersburg with a score of 0–4.

On 28 August 2020, Siukayev returned to Lori FC, playing two cup games for the club before leaving on 13 January 2021.

References

External links
 

1996 births
Sportspeople from Vladikavkaz
Living people
Russian footballers
Association football goalkeepers
Russian expatriate footballers
Expatriate footballers in Armenia
FC Kuban Krasnodar players
FC Ararat-Armenia players
FC Lori players
FC Tom Tomsk players
Armenian Premier League players
FC Mashuk-KMV Pyatigorsk players
PFC Spartak Nalchik players